Mane is a commune in Alpes-de-Haute-Provence department in southeastern France.

It lies near Forcalquier. It was the birthplace of Louis Feuillée and the 18th-century botanist Jean-Paul de Rome d'Ardène. A Minim convent was situated here. The ancient Pont sur Laye is close by the town.

Population

Twin towns — sister cities
Mane is twinned with:

  Chiaverano, Italy (2001)

See also
Communes of the Alpes-de-Haute-Provence department

References

Communes of Alpes-de-Haute-Provence
Alpes-de-Haute-Provence communes articles needing translation from French Wikipedia